Hussein Hegazi (14 September 1889 – 8 October 1961) was an Egyptian international footballer who became the first African player to play in England after playing with Dulwich Hamlet and Fulham in 1911. He made one Football League appearance for Fulham, scoring one goal.

Hegazi also played for Sekka, Al Ahly and Zamalek SC in Egypt, and participated at the 1920 Summer Olympics and the 1924 Summer Olympics.

There is a street named after him in Cairo.

References

External links
Dr Tarek Said

1889 births
1961 deaths
Footballers from Cairo
Egyptian footballers
Egyptian expatriate footballers
Egypt international footballers
Footballers at the 1920 Summer Olympics
Footballers at the 1924 Summer Olympics
Olympic footballers of Egypt
Expatriate footballers in England
Fulham F.C. players
Egyptian football managers
Egypt national football team managers
English Football League players
Dulwich Hamlet F.C. players
Association football forwards

Egyptian expatriate sportspeople in England